Coleophora partitella is a moth of the family Coleophoridae. It is found from Fennoscandia and to the Iberian Peninsula, Italy and Romania and from France to Poland.

The wingspan is 16–19 mm. Adults are on wing from June to July.

The larvae feed on Achillea millefolium, Artemisia absinthium and Artemisia alba. They create a laterally strongly compressed, two-valved, black silken case of 10-11.5 mm long. The rear end is narrowed and the mouth angle is 20-25°. Larvae can be found from September to May.

References

partitella
Moths of Europe
Moths described in 1849